John Fraser (born 17 January 1978 in Dunfermline) is a Scottish footballer.

Career 

Fraser began his career with hometown club Dunfermline Athletic, before moving to Ross County

Fraser then joined Clyde, where he was an integral part of the midfield which almost won promotion to the Scottish Premier League.

Fraser was released by Clyde in 2004, and joined Stranraer, where he won promotion from the Scottish Second Division to the First, but he was released at the end of the season. He then joined Stirling Albion and once again won promotion from the Second Division, and subsequently released. Fraser joined Forfar Athletic in July 2007, and was made club captain. However, Forfar finished bottom of the Scottish Third Division in 2007-08 season, and Fraser signed for recently promoted Arbroath in May 2008.

External links 
 

1978 births
Living people
Scottish footballers
Dunfermline Athletic F.C. players
Ross County F.C. players
Clyde F.C. players
Stranraer F.C. players
Stirling Albion F.C. players
Forfar Athletic F.C. players
Arbroath F.C. players
Scottish Football League players
Scottish Premier League players
Association football midfielders